Song Joong-ki (born September 19, 1985) is a South Korean actor, singer and model. He is well known for Descendants of the sun and Space sweepers.

Film

Television series

Television shows

Music video appearances

Hosting

References

South Korean filmographies